Njøs is a Norwegian surname.

Njøs may refer to:

Arnor Njøs (born 1930), Norwegian soil researcher
Grunde Njøs (born 1967), Norwegian speed skater
Knut H. Njøs (1883-1934), Norwegian politician

See also